Bursera malacophylla is a species of plant in the Burseraceae family. It is endemic to Ecuador, found only in the Galápagos Islands,  and listed as "vulnerable."

Bursera malacophylla is a tree with grayish-brown bark. Leaves are pinnately compound with 7 or 9 leaflets.

References

Flora of the Galápagos Islands
malacophylla
Vulnerable plants
Plants described in 1902
Taxonomy articles created by Polbot